The Liberal Party–Hatoyama was a political party in Japan. It was active during 1953.

History
The party was established in March 1953, shortly before the April elections, by a group of 22 Diet members belonging to the Liberal Party who were supporters of Ichirō Hatoyama; within two days it gained a further 15 seats when the Kozen Hirokawa faction also defected. In May Mamoru Shigemitsu was elected party president.

Of the 102 candidates nominated by the party for the House of Representatives, 35 were elected. However, the party failed to win a seat in the simultaneous House of Councillors elections. Talks were subsequently held with Kaishintō about a merger, but in November most of its Diet members rejoined the Liberal Party, with the exception of eight who subsequently formed the Japan Liberal Party.

Election results

House of Representatives

House of Councillors

References

Defunct political parties in Japan
Political parties established in 1953
1953 establishments in Japan
Political parties disestablished in 1953
1953 disestablishments in Japan